
Zdravka Matišić (b. 16 June 1944, Travnik) is a Croatian Indologist and Professor at the Department of Oriental Studies and Hungarian Studies at the Faculty of Philosophy at Zagreb University.

She is known for her work in both Sanskrit and modern Indian literature, her translations from Sanskrit, including a 1980 translation of Pañcatantra, and her linguistic study of the Hindi language.

In 1996, she authored Elements of Hindi Grammar, the only manual for Hindi in Croatian.

She is also active in historical research, including on the contributions of Croatian missionaries in India, and authored the 2007 work Joy, Fear, Dedication: Contributions to the biography of Ivan Filip Vesdin Paulin and Sancto Bartholomaeo. 

Bibliography

Author

Co-author

References

1944 births
Academic staff of the University of Zagreb
Literary scholars
Croatian scholars of Buddhism
Scholars of Hinduism
21st-century Croatian historians
Indologists
Living people